The 2013 Six Nations Championship was a rugby union tournament played from 2 February to 16 March 2013. It was the 14th annual Six Nations Championship since the addition of Italy to the initial five of England, France, Ireland, Scotland and Wales, and the 119th season of the competition overall. Teams were permitted to name squads of unlimited size, but typically named between 30 and 35 players in their initial selections.

All ages, caps and clubs accurate as of 2 February 2013, the first day of the tournament. Additions to each squad following the initial announcements are indicated by an asterisk (*).

England
England head coach Stuart Lancaster named an initial 33-man squad for the tournament on 9 January 2013.

France
France head coach Philippe Saint-André named a 33-man squad for the tournament on 11 January 2013. Adrien Planté replaced Gaël Fickou and Hugo Bonneval replaced Vincent Clerc.

Ireland
Ireland head coach Declan Kidney named an initial 33-man squad for the tournament on 27 January 2013. Flanker Rhys Ruddock, centre Darren Cave, wing Andrew Trimble and fullback Robbie Henshaw were added to the squad on 5 February, following injuries to Peter O'Mahony, Gordon D'Arcy and Keith Earls. Prop Stephen Archer and fly-half Ian Madigan were added to the squad on 7 March, following injuries to Tom Court and Johnny Sexton.

Italy
Italy head coach Jacques Brunel named a 30-man squad for the tournament. Mauro Bergamasco was added to the squad on 18 February after captain Sergio Parisse was given a 30-day ban for the red card he received playing for his club side Stade Français in a Top 14 match against Union Bordeaux Bègles on 16 February.

Scotland
Scotland interim head coach Scott Johnson named a 35-man squad for the tournament on 14 January 2013.

Wales
Wales interim head coach Rob Howley named a 36-man squad for the tournament on 15 January 2013, including five uncapped players. Lock Alun Wyn Jones was called into the squad on 12 February 2013 after recovering from injury.

References

2013
2013 Six Nations Championship